Baljuvon District is a district in Khatlon Region, Tajikistan. Its capital is the village Baljuvon. The population of Baljuvon District is 30,400 (January 2020 estimate).

Administrative divisions
They are as follows:

References

Districts of Khatlon Region
Districts of Tajikistan